Yeven Mezulah is a 17th-century book by Nathan ben Moses Hannover, translated into English as Abyss of Despair in 1950. It describes the course of the Khmelnytsky Uprising in the Polish–Lithuanian Commonwealth from a Jewish perspective. Hannover in this work gives a brief description of the Polish Crown of the time and of the relations between the Poles, Jews and Cossacks, and the causes which led to the uprising. He also gives a  vivid picture of Jewish life in Poland and the yeshivot.

The book was printed in Hebrew in Venice in 1653. It was translated into Yiddish (1687), into German (1720), and into French by Daniel Levy (published by Benjamin II, Tlemçen, 1855). This last translation was revised by the historian J. Lelewel, and served as a basis for Meyer Kayserling's German translation (also published by Benjamin II, Hanover, 1863). Kostomarov, utilizing Salomon Mandelkern's Russian translation, gives many extracts from it in his Bogdan Chmielnicki (iii. 283–306).

Sources and credibility

Rabbi Hannover witnessed the outbreak of the events in Zasław, from which he fled to Międzybóż. In addition, he compiled the book from rumors and other printed sources:  "Tzok ha-Ittim" [Sufferings of the Times] by Meir ben Samuel of Shcherbreshin (published in 1650), "Meghillat Efa" [Scroll of Darkness] by Shabbatai HaKohen (1651), and "Petach Teshuva" (פתח תשובה, "Gates of Penitence") by Gabriel Ben Yehoshua Schussburg (1651 ).

In the late 20th century some historians disputed the numbers given Yeven Mezulah. They claim it overstates Jewish casualties during the Bohdan Khmelnytsky rebellion in 1648 and 1649. These authors tend to question it as a reliable historical source in spite of its literary qualities. Yeven Mezulah was criticized in particular by Shaul Stampfer, Edward Fram, Paul Robert Magocsi's "Ukraine: A History", and Petro Mirchuk.
However others authors regard it as a reliable historical account.

Book title
The author writes in his introduction "I named my book YEVEN M'TZULAH (THE DEEP MIRE) because the words of Psalmist allude to these terrible events." (Earlier he is speaking of Psalm 69). Before that, in the introduction the author performs some gematria:  "TAVATI B'YAVAN M'FZULAH (I am sunk in a deep mire) is of the same numerical value as "CHMIEL VKEDAR B'YAVAN YACHDAV CHUBARU (Chmiel[nitski] and the Tartars joined together with the "Greeks"), which involves a biblical pun: hinting that he sunk into the mire of Yevanim (the word is derived from "Ionians" i.e., "Greeks", which is a metonymic hint to the Eastern (Greek) Orthodox Church, i.e., Cossacks/Russians. Jakob Josef Petuchowski suggests that this pun / allusion ("mire"/"Greeks"/"Russians") was known to  the censors of the Russian Empire and therefore Yeven Mezulah was banned.

Modern translations
1950: English: Abyss of Despair
1997: Russian:  Натан Ганновер. Пучина бездонная: Еврейские хроники XVII столетия / Пер. и комм. С.Я. Борового. — Москва-Иерусалим
2010: Ukrainian: Глибокий мул. Хроніка Натана Гановера / Ред. та ком. Наталі Яковенко. — Київ: Дух і Літера, 2010. — 180 с.

References

External links
Book text in the original Hebrew at  website
Book text in the 1950 English translation (Abyss of Despair)
Book image at HebrewBooks.org (free download)

17th-century books
History books about Judaism
Khmelnytsky Uprising